Bounty Bob Strikes Back! is the sequel to Miner 2049er published in 1984 for the Atari 8-bit family. The game adds a pseudo-3D look to the platforms and increases the level count from 10 to 25. As with the original, the Atari 8-bit version was released on ROM cartridge. A port for the Atari 5200 was released the same year, followed by versions for the Commodore 64, Amstrad CPC, and ZX Spectrum in 1985.

Gameplay

Gameplay is similar to Miner 2049er in that the player must inspect every section of 25 mines while avoiding mutants within a set time. One difference from the original game is that after losing a life, sections on platforms remain covered and destroyed enemies do not reappear, thus making it easier to complete a level.

Reception
The game reached number nine on Billboard'''s list of top-selling entertainment computer software in June 1985.

In Steve Panak's column for ANALOG Computing, he found the large number of screens and the different elements in them to be a strong point: "It is this variety which saves Bob from mediocrity." He didn't like the unskippable animations when a new entry is added to the high score table, especially as the scores only persist until the computer is turned off.

In the final issue of Your Sinclair, the ZX Spectrum version was ranked number 56 on "The Your Sinclair Official Top 100 Games of All Time." In 2004, the ZX Spectrum version was voted the 19th best game of all time by Retro Gamer readers in an article originally intended for a special issue of Your Sinclair bundled with Retro Gamer''.

References

External links
Bounty Bob Strikes Back at Atari Mania

1984 video games
Amstrad CPC games
Atari 5200 games
Atari 8-bit family games
Big Five Software games
Commodore 64 games
Single-player video games
U.S. Gold games
Video game sequels
Video games developed in the United States
ZX Spectrum games